The 2007 Columbia Lions football team was an American football team that represented Columbia University during the 2007 NCAA Division I FCS football season. Columbia finished last in the Ivy League. Columbia averaged 4,172 fans per game.

In their second season under head coach Norries Wilson, the Lions compiled a 1–9 record and were outscored 283 to 156. Craig Hormann, Drew Quinn and JoJo Smith were the team captains.  

The Lions' winless (0–7) conference record placed eighth in the Ivy League standings. Columbia was outscored 257 to 143 by Ivy opponents. 

Columbia played its homes games at Robert K. Kraft Field at Lawrence A. Wien Stadium in Upper Manhattan, in New York City. The field at Wien Stadium was dedicated to Robert Kraft, a Columbia graduate and owner of the New England Patriots, during the October 13 homecoming game.

Schedule

References

Columbia
Columbia Lions football seasons
Columbia Lions football